Hida may refer to:

Places
 Hida Province, a former province in Japan
 Hida, Gifu, a city in Gifu Prefecture, Japan
 Hida (region), the northern region of Gifu Prefecture, Japan
 Hida, Sălaj, a commune in Romania
 Hida Minzoku Mura Folk Village, an open air historical museum in Gifu Prefecture, Japan

Transport
 Hida (train), a train service in Japan
 JCG Hida class patrol vessel - a class of patrol vessel of the Japan Coast Guard

Acronyms
 Hydroxy iminodiacetic acid, abbreviated as HIDA
 HIDA scan, cholescintigraphy using hepatobiliary iminodiacetic acid

Other uses
 Chaim Yosef David Azulai (1724 -1806), rabbinical scholar commonly known as Hida
 Hida (surname), a Japanese surname
 Hebrew acronym for Rabbi Chaim Joseph David Azulai